Starkweather may refer to:

People 
 Amelia Minerva Starkweather (1840–1926), American educator and author
 Charles Starkweather (1938–1959), spree killer in 1957–58
 David A. Starkweather (1802–1876), American politician and diplomat
 Gary Starkweather (1938–2019), American engineer and inventor
 George Anson Starkweather (Michigan businessman) (1826–1907), American merchant, teacher, and politician
 George Anson Starkweather (New York politician) (1794–1879), American politician
 George Anson Starkweather (Pennsylvania lawyer) (1821–1904), American lawyer, merchant, schoolteacher and public official
 Henry H. Starkweather (1826–1876), American politician
 John Amsden Starkweather (1925–2001), American clinical psychologist at University of California, San Francisco
 John Converse Starkweather (1829–1890), brigadier general in the Civil War and Washington, D.C., lawyer
 Mary Ann Starkweather (1819–1897), American philanthropist
 Norris Garshom Starkweather (1818–1885), American architect; see Potter Building
 Samuel Starkweather (1799–1876), collector of the ports and mayor of Cleveland, Ohio

Other 
 Starkweather, North Dakota, United States
 Starkweather (band), an American hardcore / metal (metalcore) band
 Starkweather (film), a 2004 film based on Charles Starkweather
 Starkweather (comics), a comic series from Arcana Studio and Archaia Studios Press